Adam Bielański (14 December 1912 – 4 September 2016) was a Polish chemist and professor of Jagiellonian University. He was a member of the Polish Academy of Sciences. He was the author of several university-level books on inorganic chemistry, many of which are standard textbooks for students at most universities in Poland.

Bielański was born in Kraków, at the time part of Austria-Hungary. His brother Władysław (1911–1982) was a professor of biology, as was his sister, Zofia Bielańska-Osuchowska. He turned 100 years old in December 2012 and died in 2016 at the age of 103.

References

1912 births
2016 deaths
Polish chemists
Academic staff of Jagiellonian University
Members of the Polish Academy of Sciences
Polish centenarians
Men centenarians
Scientists from Kraków